Sadabad (also Romanized as Sa‘dābād; also known as Sa‘īdābād) is a village in Rigan Rural District, in the Central District of Rigan County, Kerman Province, Iran. At the 2006 census, its population was 1,055, in 233 families.

References 

Populated places in Rigan County